The Patsy Clark Mansion is a Spokane, Washington, United States, residence that was designed by architect Kirtland Cutter in 1897 for mining millionaire Patsy Clark. It is located at 2208 West Second Avenue in the city's historic Browne's Addition. The mansion had long been used as a restaurant. In 2002, a law firm purchased the mansion for $1.03 million in order to rescue the landmark from further deterioration. The mansion now houses a law firm, while still remaining open for private rentals for small events.

It was listed on the National Register of Historic Places as Clark Mansion in 1975.  It is included also as a contributing property in Browne's Addition Historic District.

References

External links 
 Sunset at the Patsy Clark Mansion,  Spokane, Washington
Information and Event Reservations Patsy Clark Mansion
HauntedHouses.com
Spokane City-County Historic Preservation Department Patsy Clark Mansion

Henry C Matthews, Kirtland Cutter: Architect in the Land of Promise, University of Washington Press 1998

Buildings and structures in Spokane, Washington
Houses completed in 1898
Houses in Spokane County, Washington
Houses on the National Register of Historic Places in Washington (state)
Kirtland Cutter buildings
Clark Mansion